Leijten is a Dutch surname. Notable people with the surname include:

Nick Leijten (born 1991), Dutch footballer
Renske Leijten (born 1979), Dutch politician

See also
Henriette van Lynden-Leijten (1950–2010), Dutch diplomat

Dutch-language surnames